The 1972 NAIA men's basketball tournament was held in March at Municipal Auditorium in Kansas City, Missouri. The 35th annual NAIA basketball tournament featured 32 teams playing in a single-elimination format. 

This year was the first and only tournament since seeding began in 1957 that all 4 top seeded teams made it to the national semi-finals. Seeding was changed in 2016, so each bracket is now seeded 1 thru 8. Kentucky State becomes the second team to win three in a row, joining Tennessee State (1957, 1958, 1959).

Awards and honors
Leading scorer: Travis Grant, Kentucky State
Leading rebounder: Mike Ratliff, Wisconsin-Eau Claire 81 rebounds in 5 games.
Player of the Year: est. 1994 
Most Points Single Game: 60, Travis Grant, Kentucky State vs. Minot State (N.D.)
Most Points Single Tournament: 213, Travis Grant, Kentucky State
Most Points, Career: 518, Travis Grant, Kentucky State, 1970-71-72
Most Field Goals Made, Game: 27, Travis Grant, Kentucky State vs. Minot State (N.D.)
Most Field Goals Made, Tournament: 89, Travis Grant, Kentucky State
Most Field Goals Made, Career: 223, Travis Grant, Kentucky State, 1970-71-72

1972 NAIA bracket

  * denotes overtime.

Third-place game
The third-place game featured the losing teams from the national semifinalist to determine 3rd and 4th places in the tournament. This game was played until 1988.

See also
 1972 NCAA University Division basketball tournament
 1972 NCAA College Division basketball tournament

References

NAIA Men's Basketball Championship
Tournament
NAIA men's basketball tournament
NAIA men's basketball tournament
College basketball tournaments in Missouri
Basketball competitions in Kansas City, Missouri